Snagov (Romanian: Lacul Snagov) is a lake in Snagov commune, about  north of Bucharest, Romania.

Lake Snagov as well as the nearby Snagov Forest is a protected natural area.
For both of them, further help and assistance is required to preserve the biodiversity (over 20 protected species).

Snagov Monastery is situated on an islet near the lake's northeastern end, just across Snagov Stadium.

An isolated island monastery in the middle of Lake Snagov houses the Vlad the Impaler's purported final resting place.

External links
 Snagov.ro

Lakes of Romania
Geography of Ilfov County
Protected areas of Romania